Rhacocleis is a genus of bush crickets in the subfamily Tettigoniinae and tribe Platycleidini. Species can be found in southern Europe, the Middle East and North Africa.

Species
The Catalogue of Life lists:
Rhacocleis acutangula Karabag, 1957
Rhacocleis agiostratica Werner, 1937
Rhacocleis anatolica Werner, 1933
Rhacocleis annulata Fieber, 1853 - type species (as R. annulatus Fieber)
Rhacocleis ayali Karabag, 1974
Rhacocleis baccettii Galvagni, 1976
Rhacocleis bonfilsi Galvagni, 1976
Rhacocleis buchichii Herman, 1874
Rhacocleis corsicana Bonfils, 1960
Rhacocleis crypta Willemse & Willemse, 2005
Rhacocleis derrai Harz, 1983
Rhacocleis distinguenda Werner, 1934
Rhacocleis edentata Willemse, 1982
Rhacocleis ferdinandi Willemse & Tilmans, 1987
Rhacocleis germanica Herrich-Schäffer, 1840
Rhacocleis graeca Uvarov, 1942
Rhacocleis insularis Ramme, 1928
Rhacocleis japygia La Greca, 1959
Rhacocleis lithoscirtetes Willemse & Willemse, 2005
Rhacocleis maculipedes Ingrisch, 1983
Rhacocleis neglecta Costa, 1863
Rhacocleis poneli Harz & Voisin, 1987
Rhacocleis ramburi Serville, 1838
Rhacocleis silviarum Galvagni, 1984
Rhacocleis sylvestrii Ramme, 1939
Rhacocleis thyrrhenica La Greca, 1952
Rhacocleis trilobata La Greca & Messina, 1974
Rhacocleis tuberculata Karabag, 1978
Rhacocleis turcica Uvarov, 1930
Rhacocleis uvarovi Ramme, 1936
Rhacocleis werneri Willemse, 1982

References

Orthoptera genera
Tettigoniinae
Orthoptera of Europe